Edgar Wilson "Bill" Nye (August 25, 1850February 22, 1896) was an American humorist. He was also the founder and editor of the Laramie Boomerang.

Biography
Nye was born in Shirley, Maine. His parents removed to a farm on the St. Croix river in northern Wisconsin in 1852, and he was educated at River Falls, Wisconsin, where he studied law. He moved to Wyoming Territory, and was admitted to the bar at Laramie City, Wyoming Territory in 1876. There he served as justice of the peace, superintendent of schools, member of the city council and postmaster. He began early to contribute humorous sketches to the newspapers, using the pen name of "Bill Nye" after a character in a famous poem by Bret Harte popularly known as "The Heathen Chinee". He was connected with various western journals, and afterward settled in New York City.

The Boomerang was founded while Nye was the postmaster of Laramie. It launched him to national fame, gaining subscribers in every state and some foreign countries. In 1892, he wrote in The Century Magazine:

Some of his works include Bill Nye's Comic History of the United States, Baled Hay, Remarks, Bill Nye and Boomerang, Bill Nye's History of England, and Bill Nye's Red Book. He is credited with the remark "Wagner's music is better than it sounds.".

Late in his career, he was briefly associated with James Whitcomb Riley with whom he wrote two books. They also appeared together on the lecture circuit. He also traveled and lectured with Luther Burbank.

He passed the later years of his life in Arden, North Carolina where he died of meningitis, and was buried in Calvary Episcopal Churchyard in Fletcher, Henderson County, North Carolina. A historical marker honoring him is located in St. Croix County, Wisconsin, between the towns of Roberts and River Falls, and a second is located in Fletcher, North Carolina. A small monument marks his birthplace in Shirley, Maine.

Gallery

Notes

References

External links

 
 
 
 Readings of Bill Nye stories at Mister Ron's Basement podcast, indexed (ronevry.com)
 
 

1850 births
1896 deaths
American humorists
Neurological disease deaths in North Carolina
Infectious disease deaths in North Carolina
Deaths from meningitis
People from Laramie, Wyoming
People from Piscataquis County, Maine
People from River Falls, Wisconsin
Writers from Maine
Writers from Wisconsin
Writers from Wyoming
19th-century American journalists
American male journalists
19th-century American male writers